The Fifth Cabinet of Kim Kielsen was the Government of Greenland, in office between 5 October 2018 and 9 April 2019. It was a coalition minority government consisting of Siumut, Solidarity and Descendants of Our Country.

List of ministers
The Social Democratic Forward haD 6 ministers including the Premier. The Liberalistic Solidarity had 2 ministers. The Centrist party Descendants of Our Country had 1 minister.

|}

Party breakdown 
Party breakdown of cabinet ministers:

See also 
Cabinet of Greenland

References

 

Government of Greenland
Coalition governments
Politics of Greenland
Kielsen, Kim V
2016 establishments in Greenland
Cabinets established in 2018
2018 in Greenland
Greenland politics-related lists